Richard John "Rick" Kessell (born July 27, 1949) is a Canadian former professional ice hockey centre who played in the NHL for the Pittsburgh Penguins and California Golden Seals.

Career
Drafted 15th overall by the Penguins in the 1969 NHL Amateur Draft, Kessell played 135 regular season games, scoring 4 goals and 24 assists for 28 career points.  One of his only 4 goals would come on March 21, 1970 during his first NHL game.  Despite his brief NHL career Kessell excelled in juniors, the minors and senior hockey. As a youth, he played in the 1961 Quebec International Pee-Wee Hockey Tournament with the Scarboro Lions.

Career statistics

Regular season and playoffs

References

External links
 

1949 births
Living people
Amarillo Wranglers players
Baltimore Clippers players
California Golden Seals players
Canadian expatriate ice hockey players in the United States
Canadian ice hockey centres
Hershey Bears players
London Nationals players
New Haven Nighthawks players
Oshawa Generals players
Pittsburgh Penguins draft picks
Pittsburgh Penguins players
Salt Lake Golden Eagles (CHL) players
Ice hockey people from Toronto
Toronto Marlboros players